Néstor Gastón Carbonell (born December 1, 1967) is an American actor, director, and screenwriter. He came to prominence for his role as Luis Rivera in the NBC sitcom Suddenly Susan. He is known for his roles as Richard Alpert in the ABC drama series Lost, Sheriff Alex Romero in the A&E drama series Bates Motel, and Yanko Flores in the Apple TV+ drama series The Morning Show. Carbonell also starred as Mayor Anthony Garcia in Christopher Nolan's superhero films The Dark Knight (2008) and The Dark Knight Rises (2012).

Early life
Carbonell was born in New York City to Cuban parents Néstor Tulio Carbonell Cortina and Rosa Ramírez de Arellano Cárdenas. His parents are of Spanish descent (his grandparents were of Catalan, Basque, Navarran, and Andalusian origins). Carbonell was raised a Roman Catholic.

Carbonell's father worked for PepsiCo, which required the family to live for periods of time in London, Mexico City, the Bahamas, and Caracas. His father is also active in the Cuban community, authoring the book And The Russians Stayed: The Sovietization of Cuba. Carbonell has an older sister, Rosa Maria "Mia" Carbonell, a Senior Vice President of Corporate Communications at Forbes. Former professional baseball player Rafael Palmeiro is his cousin. His paternal great-grandfather, José Manuel Cortina, was a noted Cuban orator and diplomat.

Carbonell was educated at The British School while living in Caracas. His family later moved back to the U.S., and he attended Deerfield Academy in Massachusetts with future Lost co-star Matthew Fox. 

In 1990, he graduated with a Bachelor of Arts in English from Harvard University (also the alma mater of his father and sister).

Career

Carbonell's first acting role was a guest starring part as Alberto Cordova in an episode of As the World Turns. He then appeared in episodes of Law & Order, Melrose Place, A Different World, Reasonable Doubts, Good Advice, Brotherly Love, and The John Larroquette Show. In 1995, he starred in a dual role, Roberto and one half of the Couple in Bar, in Stephen Sondheim and George Furth's play Getting Away with Murder. That same year, he appeared as a main cast member on the short-lived The WB sitcom Muscle. He subsequently portrayed the regular role of Luis Rivera on the Brooke Shields-led sitcom Suddenly Susan for four seasons (19962000).

For much of his early career, he played characters with thick Hispanic accents, and was so convincing that people thought it was how he actually sounded. One of his first obstacles in Hollywood was convincing them that in reality he didn't have an accent and that he is capable of doing broader roles. In 2000, Carbonell made his debut as a screenwriter with the comedy film Attention Shoppers, in which he also starred as Enrique Suarez, the lead role. He has since had recurring roles on Resurrection Blvd., The Tick, Kim Possible (as the voice of Señor Senior Jr.), Century City, Strong Medicine, and Cold Case. He also guest starred on Scrubs (in the episode "My Moment of Un-Truth"), House (in the episode "Cursed"), Monk (in the episode "Mr. Monk Gets Married"), and Day Break (in the episode "What If He Can Change the Day?"). In 2006, he appeared alongside his future Lost co-star Matthew Fox, as assassin Pasquale Acosta, in the film Smokin' Aces.

Carbonell was cast as Richard Alpert on the third season of ABC's drama series Lost. The mysteries surrounding his ageless character were heavily discussed among the fan community throughout his arc in the season. While producing the final episodes of the third season, Carbonell was cast in a starring role as Frank Duque on the CBS series Cane. The writers of Lost modified their original story plan for the third season in anticipation for Carbonell's potential unavailability. Despite Carbonell's willingness to return to the ABC series, CBS president Nina Tassler ruled out another guest appearance. Cane was cancelled during the 2007–2008 Writers Guild of America strike, freeing Carbonell from his contract with CBS. In 2008, Lost showrunner Carlton Cuse stated that Carbonell would reprise his role as Richard Alpert towards the end of the series' fourth season, as a result of Cane cancellation. Carbonell made appearances in the episodes "Cabin Fever" and "There's No Place Like Home". Cuse cited this as an unintended positive consequence of the strike. Carbonell appeared in nine episodes of the fifth season, and was upgraded to a main cast member of Lost for its sixth and final season.

In 2008, he landed the role of Mayor Anthony Garcia in Christopher Nolan's The Dark Knight. His wife, Shannon Kenny, was previously involved in a Batman project, voicing the character Inque in the Batman Beyond television series. In 2010, Carbonell joined the series Psych for two episodes playing Declan Rand, a criminal profiler. In 2011, Carbonell starred in the CW series Ringer as FBI agent Victor Machado. Also in 2011, he was announced to guest star in FX comedy series Wilfred, a role which later turned into a recurring one. The following year, Carbonell briefly appeared in The Dark Knight Rises, reprising his role as Mayor Anthony Garcia in the final installment of Christopher Nolan's Dark Knight trilogy.

From 2013 to the series' ending in 2017, he portrayed Sheriff Alex Romero in the A&E Psycho prequel series Bates Motel, opposite Vera Farmiga and Freddie Highmore. In the first season, he starred in a recurring capacity, but was upgraded to a main cast member starting with the second season. Carbonell also directed three episodes of the series. In 2014, he guest starred on the CBS drama series Person of Interest in the episode "Most Likely to...", and on the CBS political drama series The Good Wife in the episode "The Deep Web". That same year, he began recurring as Raymond Navaro in NBC's espionage thriller series State of Affairs. In 2017, Carbonell directed the episode "Apple" of the ABC drama series The Good Doctor, starring his Bates Motel co-star Highmore.

Personal life
Carbonell has been married to Australian actress Shannon Kenny since January 3, 2001. They met while working together on the 1995 television series Muscle and went on to co-star in the 2000 film Attention Shoppers, which Carbonell wrote. The couple have two sons, Rafael (born 2002) and Marco (born 2005). He is a practising Roman Catholic.

Carbonell's dark eyelashes have been a staple topic of discussion in interviews, and both Carbonell and the producers of Lost made it clear they are not enhanced by any form of makeup. A short skit during the Lost panel at the 2009 San Diego Comic-Con International featured Carbonell allegedly applying eyeliner before throwing a Christian Bale-esque rant upon receiving the wrong color makeup from an assistant. In a season 5 episode of Lost, James "Sawyer" Ford refers to Carbonell's character as "your buddy out there with the eyeliner." In addition, in the Psych episode "Shawn 2.0", Shawn Spencer makes a comment about him having "impossibly dark eyelashes."

He is fluent in Spanish, a skill he put to use in the sixth-season episode of Lost, "Ab Aeterno", in which numerous scenes contain dialogue mostly or solely in Spanish. He also starred in a Spanish-language Heineken commercial.

Filmography

Film

Television

Stage

Other credits

Accolades

References

External links

 
 Q&A Sessions: The Dark Knight's Nestor Carbonell [nocheLatina.com]

1967 births
20th-century American male actors
21st-century American male actors
American male film actors
American male screenwriters
American male stage actors
American male television actors
American male voice actors
American entertainers of Cuban descent
American people of Spanish descent
American Roman Catholics
Film producers from New York (state)
American television directors
Deerfield Academy alumni
Harvard College alumni
Hispanic and Latino American male actors
Living people
Male actors from New York City
Screenwriters from New York (state)